Carlos Luis Torres Martínez (born 20 March 1968) is a Paraguayan retired footballer who played as a striker.

Club career
Born in Asunción, Torres began playing professionally with hometown's Club Olimpia, winning back-to-back Primera División titles with it. In 1991 he also helped the team reach the final of the Copa Libertadores, lost on aggregate to Chile's Colo-Colo (0–3). During that year he was crowned the domestic competition's topscorer in 1991, at 12 goals.

After that Libertadores tournament Torres moved to Argentina, where he would represent three clubs with different individual success (he scored nearly 50 official goals for Racing Club de Avellaneda and Argentinos Juniors combined, but only found the net once in the first division with Newell's Old Boys). He moved to Europe in 1995, joining Spanish second division side CD Badajoz and helping the Extremadurans to five consecutive seasons in the category whilst playing in more than 200 official games – never appeared in less than 34 in the league during his spell – and surpassing the 50-goal mark.

Aged 32, still in Spain and its second level, Torres signed for Real Jaén, being relegated in his second season – however, he had already left the Andalusians in the previous transfer window, moving to another team in the country, Ciudad de Murcia. After only a couple of months, he returned to his previous club.

Torres closed out his career in 2005, representing Tacuary in his homeland.

International career
Torres represented Paraguay at the 1993 Copa América in Ecuador, as the national team exited in the quarterfinals after a 0–3 loss against the hosts.

External links
 Argentine League statistics at Fútbol XXI 
 
 

1968 births
Living people
Sportspeople from Asunción
Paraguayan footballers
Association football forwards
Club Olimpia footballers
Club Tacuary footballers
Argentine Primera División players
Racing Club de Avellaneda footballers
Newell's Old Boys footballers
Argentinos Juniors footballers
Segunda División players
Segunda División B players
CD Badajoz players
Real Jaén footballers
Ciudad de Murcia footballers
Paraguay international footballers
1993 Copa América players
Paraguayan expatriate footballers
Expatriate footballers in Argentina
Expatriate footballers in Spain
Paraguayan expatriate sportspeople in Argentina
Paraguayan expatriate sportspeople in Spain